Henbury railway station served the Bristol suburb of Henbury, England, from 1910 to 1965. The station was situated on the Henbury Loop Line of the Great Western Railway and was opened on 9 May 1910 for passenger services. Under the Beeching cuts, it was closed to passengers on 23 November 1964, with goods services ceasing on 5 July 1965. There is a proposal to reopen the station as part of the Greater Bristol Metro scheme.

History
Opened by the Great Western Railway on 9 May 1910, Henbury station was situated on the Henbury Loop Line which was inaugurated on the same day. The new line formed part of the Great Western's main route to Avonmouth Docks via Stoke Gifford Junction on the Bristol and Gloucester Railway. Regular passenger services ceased to call at the station between 1915 and 1922, although it appears that unadvertised workmen's services were used by the public to reach the station. In fact, a note in the list of stations issued by the Railway Clearing House in 1921 stated that "Season Ticket and Ordinary Passengers are conveyed". The station was publicly advertised again from 10 July 1922.

Henbury station was listed for closure by the Beeching report and it duly closed to passengers on 23 November 1964, with goods services being withdrawn as from 5 July 1965.

The station's former goods yard was sold at auction in October 2008 by BRB (Residuary) Limited after South Gloucestershire Council had declined to make an offer.

Future
Improved services on the Severn Beach Line are called for as part of the MetroWest scheme, a rail transport plan which aims to enhance transport capacity in the Bristol area. It has been suggested that Henbury railway station be reopened as part of the scheme, with the possibility of services running from Bristol Temple Meads to  via  and Henbury. The Metro scheme was given the go-ahead in July 2012 as part of the City Deal, whereby local councils would be given greater control over money by the government.

In January 2018, it was revealed that the reopened station would be on a new site rather than the former site (referred to as Henbury West) due to high costs. The opening date was pencilled in for May 2021, but has been delayed. The new station will be located close to the A4018 with access by foot, cycle, bus and car. It will link in with the Fishpool Hill development proposed by Persimmon, and will be served by an hourly service between Henbury and Bristol Temple Meads. It will be an unstaffed terminus station with one platform and trains will travel eastbound towards Bristol Temple Meads via Filton Abbey Wood, with new stations at North Filton and Ashley Down.

References

Notes

Sources

External links
 Henbury station on navigable 1946 O. S. map

Former Great Western Railway stations
Disused railway stations in Bristol, Bath and South Gloucestershire
Beeching closures in England
Railway stations in Great Britain opened in 1910
Railway stations in Great Britain closed in 1915
Railway stations in Great Britain opened in 1922
Railway stations in Great Britain closed in 1965
Proposed railway stations in England
Henbury